Kaouthar Ouallal (born 27 November 1990) is an Algerian judoka. She won the gold medal in the women's 78 kg event at the 2015 African Games. She is also a seven-time gold medalist at the African Judo Championships.

Career 

In 2019, she won the gold medal in the women's 78 kg event at the African Judo Championships held in Cape Town, South Africa. In the same year, she also competed in the women's 78 kg event at the 2019 World Judo Championships held in Tokyo, Japan.

At the 2021 African Judo Championships held in Dakar, Senegal, she won one of the bronze medals in her event. She competed in the women's 78 kg event at the 2021 World Judo Championships held in Budapest, Hungary.

Achievements

References

External links 
 

Living people
1990 births
Place of birth missing (living people)
Algerian female judoka
Mediterranean Games competitors for Algeria
Competitors at the 2018 Mediterranean Games
African Games medalists in judo
African Games gold medalists for Algeria
African Games bronze medalists for Algeria
Competitors at the 2015 African Games
Competitors at the 2019 African Games
Islamic Solidarity Games medalists in judo
Islamic Solidarity Games competitors for Algeria
20th-century Algerian women
21st-century Algerian women